Misaka-ike Dam is a gravity dam located in Tokushima prefecture in Japan. The dam is used for flood control and irrigation. The catchment area of the dam is 24.2 km2. The dam impounds about 2  ha of land when full and can store 55 thousand cubic meters of water. The construction of the dam was completed in 1946.

References

Dams in Tokushima Prefecture
1946 establishments in Japan